See Saktigarh for disambiguation

Saktigarh is a developing part of Siliguri City, Jalpaiguri district, West Bengal.

Education
The major Schools in Saktigarh include Saktigarh Vidyapith (H.S), Saktigarh Balika Bidyalaya and several primary schools.  Phani Bhusan Madhyamik Vidyalaya is a little away from Saktigarh.

Transport

A new road, named the third Mahananda Bridge, has been rebuilt connecting Burdwan Road (Nowkagath More) and Medical More.  The road is planned to join to the west with Matigara, providing seamless communication from the Station Feeder Road in the south and Deshbandhu Road in the east to the Hill Cart Road in the central part of the city.

National Highway no. 31, 31A passes through Siliguri.

Sport

Cricket, Kho Kho, Taekwon-Do, chess, and football are the five most popular sports here in Saktigarh. Saktigarh ground is the only cricket ground and matches are regularly held here.

The city is known for being the training ground for many Kho Kho players & cricketers, including India international Wriddhiman Saha.

Neighbourhoods in Siliguri